Events from the year 1538 in Sweden

Incumbents
 Monarch – Gustav I

Events

 3 March - Marriage between Svante Stensson Sture and Martha Leijonhufvud.
 The king breaks with the reformers Olaus Petri and Laurentius Andreæ.
 Conrad von Pyhy appointed Lord High Chancellor of Sweden.
 The monarch fail to ally Sweden with the Schmalkaldic League.
 The Variarum rerum vocabula is published in Sweden.

Births
 Hogenskild Bielke, soldier and politician (died 1605)
 Margareta Birgersdotter Grip,  writer and genealogist   (died 1586)
 Laurentius Nicolai, Jesuit  (died 1622)
 13 December - Sigrid Sture, noblewoman and county governor   (died 1613)

Deaths

 Hans Brask, bishop  (born 1464)
 Anna Germundsdotter, abbess

References

 
Years of the 16th century in Sweden
Sweden